Mauricio Antonio Daza Carrasco (born 21 March 1972) is a Chilean lawyer who is a member of the Chilean Constitutional Convention. He began to be known in Chile through his complaints to Soquimich and Penta, as well as by appearing on talk shows like Mentiras Verdaderas.

During the Chilean social outbreak, he was human rights lawyer.

References

External links
 

Living people
1972 births
20th-century Chilean lawyers
21st-century Chilean politicians
Members of the Chilean Constitutional Convention
21st-century Chilean lawyers